The following is a list of contestants that have appeared on the ITV2 reality series Love Island. The youngest Islander is Amelia Peters, who was 18 years old when she took part in the third series, whereas the oldest Islanders are Jordan Ring, Marcel Somerville and Paul Knops, all of whom were 31 years old when they entered the villa in series 1, 3 and 4, respectively.

The youngest winners are Amber Davies and Finn Tapp, who were 20 years old when they won the third and sixth series, respectively. Ekin-Su Cülcüloğlu and Davide Sanclimenti are the oldest winners at 27 years old when they won the eighth series together.

Islanders
Key
 Winner
 Runner-up
 Third place
 Fourth place
 Walked
 Removed
 Contestant entered for the second time

References

Love Island (2015 TV series) contestants

Love Island (2015 TV series)